Pigliaru is a Sardinian surname. Notable people with the surname include:

Antonio Pigliaru (1922–1969), Italian jurist and philosopher
Francesco Pigliaru (born 1954), Italian economist, politician, and professor

See also
 Sardinian surnames
 Pagliarulo